Cantharidus fulminatus is a species of marine gastropod mollusc in the family Trochidae, the top shells.

Description
The small, globose-conoidal shell measures 7½ mm. It is narrowly perforate, shining, solid, smooth, except for a few stride around the white umbilicus. Its color is pink, orange, purplish or olive-brown, generally with a series of white blotches alternating with self-colored darker ones below the sutures, a girdle of white blotches around the periphery and often around the umbilicus. The intervening spaces are irregularly strigate with darker zigzag streaks or unicolored. The apex is rosy. The spire is short and contains about 5 convex whorls. The rounded-quadrate aperture is iridescent within. The lip is white-margined. The arcuate columella  is a trifle straightened in the middle.

Distribution
It is a shallow water gastropod, found only off the Chatham Islands of New Zealand.

References

 Powell A. W. B., 1979: New Zealand Mollusca: Marine, Land and Freshwater Shells. William Collins Publishers Ltd, Auckland 1979 

fulminatus
Gastropods of New Zealand
Gastropods described in 1873